The Jamaica women's national field hockey team represents Jamaica in women's international field hockey competitions and is controlled by the Jamaica Hockey Federation, the governing body for field hockey in Jamaica.

Tournament record

Pan American Games
1987 – 6th place
1991 – 5th place
1995 – 6th place
2003 – 7th place

Pan American Cup
2001 – 5th place
2009 – 7th place

Central American and Caribbean Games
1986 – 
1990 – 
1993 – 
1998 – 
2002 – 
2006 – 5th place
2010 – 6th place
2014 – 7th place
2018 – 6th place
 2023 – Qualified

Commonwealth Games
1998 – 8th place

Hockey World League
2014–15 – Round 1

See also
Jamaica men's national field hockey team

References

External links
Jamaica Hockey Federation

Americas women's national field hockey teams
Field hockey
National team